William King-Noel, 1st Earl of Lovelace, FRS (21 February 1805 – 29 December 1893), styled the Honourable William King until 1833 and Lord King from 1833 to 1838, was an English nobleman and scientist.

Early life and background 
Lovelace was the eldest son of Peter King, 7th Baron King, and his wife, Lady Hester Fortescue, granddaughter of George Grenville. The politician the Hon. Peter John Locke King was his younger brother.

Educated at Eton and Trinity, he entered the diplomatic service and became secretary to Lord Nugent. He succeeded in the barony in 1833 when his father died. He performed architectural work in his houses.

He was created Viscount Ockham and Earl of Lovelace in 1838 (through his wife Ada), and appointed Lord-Lieutenant of Surrey in 1840, a post he held until his death. On 25 November 1841, he was admitted a Fellow of the Royal Society. He was appointed Colonel of the 2nd Royal Surrey Militia on 14 August 1852. He resigned this command on 11 April 1870, when he was appointed Honorary Colonel of the regiment (which became the 3rd Battalion, Queen's (Royal West Surrey Regiment), a position he held until his death. In 1860, he adopted the additional surname of "Noel".

Ben Damph Estate
In 1886, the Earl purchased Ben Damph Lodge and its surrounding 12,000 acre sporting estate at the east end of Loch Torridon, in Ross-shire, Scotland. In 1889, he became a promoter of the Aultbea Railway.

Notes
 co

References
 Burke's Peerage, Baronetage and Knightage, 100th Edn, London, 1953.
 Capt John Davis, Historical Records of the Second Royal Surrey or Eleventh Regiment of Militia, London: Marcus Ward, 1877.

1805 births
1893 deaths
William
William
Fellows of the Royal Society
Lord Byron
Lord-Lieutenants of Surrey
Surrey Militia officers
Peers of the United Kingdom created by Queen Victoria